An Asociación Civil (civil association), in the legal systems of many Spanish-speaking countries, is a nonprofit organization.

Examples include:
 Nuestras Hijas de Regreso a Casa a.c.
 Asociación de Maquiladoras a.c.

Non-profit organizations